The 1973–74 Liga Alef season saw Hapoel Acre (champions of the North Division) and Maccabi Sha'arayim (champions of the South Division) win their regional divisions, and qualify with the second-placed clubs, Shimshon Tel Aviv and Hapoel Marmorek for promotion play-offs against the bottom two clubs in Liga Leumit, Hakoah Ramat Gan and Maccabi Haifa. Shimshon Tel Aviv were the only promoted club from Liga Alef to Liga Leumit.

On same basis, promotion-relegation play-offs contested between the bottom Liga Alef clubs and the top Liga Bet clubs.

North Division

South Division

Promotion play-offs

Relegation play-offs

North play-offs

Beitar Tiberias suspended from the play-offs due to crowd trouble against Hapoel Beit She'an.

South play-offs

References
Goal difference caused relegation Maariv, 23.6.74, Historical Jewish Press 
Israel - List of final tables RSSSF
Jaffa and Ramla will play in Liga Alef Davar, 21.7.74, Historical Jewish Press 
Previous seasons The Israel Football Association 

Liga Alef seasons
Israel
2